Tuttie Flutie is a jazz album recorded by the Toshiko Akiyoshi Trio with a flute quartet.  It was released in 1980 on the Discomate (Japan) record label.

Track listing
All songs arranged by Toshiko Akiyoshi.  All songs composed by Toshiko Akiyoshi except as noted:
LP side A
"Tuttie Flutie" – 5:14
"Falling Petal" (Tabackin) – 5:27
"Manhã De Carnaval" (Bonfá) – 5:23
LP side B
"Blue Dream" – 8:33
"Chic Lady" – 5:58
"Last Minute Blues" – 4:03

Personnel
Toshiko Akiyoshi – piano
Bob Bowman – bass
Joey Baron – drums
Louise diTullio – flute
Geraldine Rotella – flute
Monday (Michiru Akiyoshi) Mariano – flute
Susan Greenberg – flute

References / External Links
Discomate DSP-8107

Toshiko Akiyoshi albums
1980 albums